Pilum is the heavy javelin of the Roman legions.

Pilum may also refer to:
 Pilum (Battlefield 2142 anti-vehicle weapon)
 Pilum, Iran, a village in Kerman Province, Iran